Francis David Kilby (24 April 1906 – 3 September 1985) was a New Zealand rugby union player and administrator. He played 18 matches for the All Blacks, 13 of which were as captain, including four internationals. He later served on the executive of the New Zealand Rugby Union between 1955 and 1974, and managed the New Zealand Māori team on their tour of Australia in 1958, and the All Blacks on the 1963–64 tour of Britain, Ireland, France and North America.

References

1906 births
1985 deaths
Rugby union players from Invercargill
People educated at Southland Boys' High School
New Zealand rugby union players
New Zealand international rugby union players
Southland rugby union players
Wellington rugby union players
Wanganui rugby union players
Taranaki rugby union players
Rugby union scrum-halves
New Zealand Rugby Football Union officials